Leighton A. Hope (December 9, 1921 – February 14, 1998) was an American politician from New York.

Life
He was born on December 9, 1921, in Washington, D.C., the son of Claude Allison Hope (1893–1970). He attended Taft School. During World War II he served in the U.S. Army Air Force. He graduated from DePauw University in 1946. In 1950, he moved to Cortland, New York, and operated radio station WKRT there. He also entered politics as a Republican. He married Polly Pierce Gochenour (born 1924), and they had three sons.

Hope was a member of the New York State Senate (46th D.) from 1963 to 1965, sitting in the 174th and 175th New York State Legislatures. On January 8, 1966, he was appointed as Secretary of the New York State Department of Conservation. Afterwards he was a Deputy New York State Park Commissioner.

He died on February 14, 1998.

The Hope Lake in Virgil, New York, was named in his honor.

Sources

1921 births
1998 deaths
People from Washington, D.C.
People from Cortland, New York
Republican Party New York (state) state senators
DePauw University alumni
Taft School alumni
20th-century American politicians
United States Army Air Forces personnel of World War II